William Frank Brinkman is an American physicist who served as president of the American Physical Society (2002) and was the head of the Office of Science at the United States Department of Energy (2009–2013). He was elected to the National Academy of Sciences in 1984, and won the George E. Pake Prize in 1994. He was elected as a member of the American Academy of Arts and Sciences in 1992, and became a member of the American Philosophical Society in 2002.

Brinkman was born on July 20, 1938, in Washington, Missouri. He received his bachelor's degree (1960) and PhD (1965) in physics from the University of Missouri.

Brinkman joined Bell Labs in 1966, working in the physics research laboratory. From 1984 to 1987, he served as vice president of research at Sandia National Laboratories. In 1987 he became executive director of the physics research division at Bell Labs.

Brinkman joined Princeton University in 2001, where he continued his condensed matter physics research. In 2009, he was appointed as director of the Office of Science in the U.S. Department of Energy, where he served until 2013. During his tenure at the USDOE, Brinkman infamously tried unsuccessfully to retire MIT's fusion energy research program, which would have been disastrous for modern fusion energy research.

References

External links 

 Oral history interview transcript for William F. Brinkman on 7 March 2006, American Institute of Physics, Niels Bohr Library & Archives - Session I
 Oral history interview transcript for William F. Brinkman on 26 April 2006, American Institute of Physics, Niels Bohr Library & Archives - Session II

1938 births
Living people
Physicists from Missouri
Fellows of the American Physical Society
Members of the United States National Academy of Sciences
Scientists at Bell Labs
Princeton University faculty
University of Missouri alumni
20th-century American physicists

Members of the American Philosophical Society
Presidents of the American Physical Society